Munavvar Rzayeva (6 June 1929 – 6 June 2004) was an Azerbaijani sculptor and the first monumental female sculptor, Honored Artist of the Azerbaijan Republic.

Biography

Munavvar Rzayeva was born on 6 June 1929 in Shusha. She grew up in the family of a carpet master, Majid, in Shusha. In 1950 Rzayeva graduated from Azerbaijan State Art School named after Azim Azimzade in Baku, and in 1956 from the Faculty of Sculpture of the Moscow State Academy of Arts named after V.I.Surikov. She educated in the class of Nikolai Tomsky.

From 1943, she participated in various exhibitions. Rzayeva has been elected member of the Union of Artists of Azerbaijan since 1953. At the same time, he was a member of the State Commission of the Ministry of Culture, worked as a restorer artist at the Nizami Literature Museum of ANAS and restored a number of sculptures.

Her works are kept in National Art Museum of Azerbaijan, Nizami Museum of Azerbaijani Literature, Ordubadi Museum, Siyazan House of Culture and Art Foundation.

M.Rzayeva was a master of psychological portraits. She had used granite, marble, bronze, wood, etc. materials to create sculptures. Munavvar Rzayeva's works were mainly consist of sculptures of art workers, including statues, busts, and bas-reliefs of statesmen and labor heroes. The busts of Huseyn Javid, Sergey Yesenin, Nariman Narimanov, Mikayil Mushfig and Nazim Hikmet play a special role in her creative activity.

Munavvar Rzayeva died on 6 June 2004 in Baku.

Awards
 Honored Artist of the Azerbaijan Republic – 4 March 1992

Memorial
In 2019, the 90th anniversary of Munavvar Rzayeva was celebrated.

Works

References

1929 births
2004 deaths
20th-century Azerbaijani women artists
Soviet women artists
Soviet artists
Azerbaijani sculptors
Azerbaijani women sculptors
People from Shusha